John Tucker may refer to:

Politics
John Randolph Tucker (politician) (1823–1897), United States Representative from Virginia
John Randolph Tucker (judge) (1854–1926), member of the Virginia Senate and territorial judge in Alaska, United States
J. Randolph Tucker Jr. (1914–2015), member of the Virginia House of Delegates, United States
John Tucker (MP) (died 1779), British MP for Weymouth and Melcombe Regis
John Tucker (Tasmanian politician) (born 1975), Member for Lyons in the Tasmanian House of Assembly

Sports
John Tucker (American football) (1901–1983), American football player and coach, head coach at Arkansas Tech University, 1933–1947
John Tucker (ice hockey) (born 1964), Canadian NHL hockey player
John Tucker (lacrosse) (fl. 1976–2015), American lacrosse player and coach

Others
John Tucker (merchant trader) (fl. 1665–1694), English slave trader for the Royal African Company from London, England
John Tucker, president of the Philadelphia and Reading Railroad, 1844–1856
John A. Tucker (1896–1971), American fireman and music composer
John Bartholomew Tucker (1930–2014), American radio and television personality
John Maurice Tucker (1916–2008), American botanist and herbarium director
J. R. Tucker (1946–2014), American physicist 
John Randolph Tucker (naval officer) (1812–1883), officer with the US, Confederate, and Peruvian navies
John Randolph Tucker (professor) (1879–1954), American lawyer and professor
John V. Tucker (born 1952), British computer scientist
John D. Tucker, American director

See also
John Randolph Tucker High School, Henrico County, Virginia, United States
John Tucker Must Die, 2006 comedy film
Jonathan Tucker (born 1982), American film and television actor
Jon Tucker (fl. 2000–2012), Canadian film maker and novelist
Tucker (surname)